The Phoenix Suns are a professional basketball team based in Phoenix, Arizona, United States. They are members of the Pacific Division of the Western Conference in the National Basketball Association (NBA). The Suns began playing in the NBA as an expansion team in the 1968–69 NBA season. In their inaugural season, the Suns posted a win–loss record of 16–66. They participated in the playoffs only once in their first seven seasons.

In the 1975–76 season, a rookie Alvan Adams helped the team reach its first NBA Finals, which they lost to the Boston Celtics 4–2. Charles Barkley and Steve Nash won the Most Valuable Player (MVP) award while playing for the Suns. Barkley led the Suns to the 1993 NBA Finals, where they lost to the Chicago Bulls. After signing with the Suns in 2004, Nash led the team to three straight division titles, but after reaching the Conference Finals in 2009–10 the Suns subsequently experienced their worst period of on-court failure, missing the playoffs for ten consecutive seasons until the 2020-21 season (the franchise's previous record playoff drought was five seasons, which happened after the team made the postseason in only their second year of existence during the 1969–70 campaign).

Despite their failures in the 2010s, the Suns franchise has the NBA's eighth-best all-time winning percentage winning 53 percent of its games, as of the 2020–21 NBA season. In their first forty-three seasons, the Suns made the playoffs 29 times, posted nineteen seasons with fifty or more wins, appeared nine times in the Western Conference Finals, and advanced to the NBA Finals three times in 1976, 1993, and 2021. As a result, based on their all-time winning percentage, the Suns are the 2nd-most successful franchise to never win an NBA championship, behind only the Utah Jazz.
The 2020 Finals loss to Miwaukee moved Phoenix past the Orlando Magic and Utah Jazz for the most Finals losses without winning a title (Orlando and Utah, as of 2022, have been to 2 NBA Finals apiece but haven't won any of them yet).

Table key

Seasons

All-time records

Notes

 This is determined by adding the absolute difference in wins between the leading team and the team of interest to the absolute difference in losses between the two teams, and dividing by two.
 Because of a lockout, the season did not start until February 5, 1999, and all 29 teams played a shortened 50-game regular season schedule.
 Because of a lockout, the season did not start until December 25, 2011, and all 30 teams played a shortened 66-game regular season schedule.
 Shaquille O'Neal shared the All-Star Game Most Valuable Player award with Kobe Bryant of the Los Angeles Lakers.

References
General

Specific

 
seasons